Estonia is a country in the Baltic region of Northern Europe. It is a developed country with an advanced, high-income economy that as of 2011 is among the fastest growing in the EU. Its Human Development Index ranks very highly, and it performs favourably in measurements of economic freedom, civil liberties and press freedom (3rd in the world in 2012 and 2007). The 2015 PISA test places Estonian high school students 3rd in the world, behind Singapore and Japan. Citizens of Estonia are provided with universal health care, free education and the longest paid maternity leave in the OECD. Since independence the country has rapidly developed its IT sector, becoming one of the world's most digitally advanced societies. In 2005 Estonia became the first nation to hold elections over the Internet, and in 2014 the first nation to provide E-residency.

For further information on the types of business entities in this country and their abbreviations, see "Business entities in Estonia".

Notable firms 
This list includes notable companies with primary headquarters located in the country. The industry and sector follow the Industry Classification Benchmark taxonomy. Organizations which have ceased operations are included and noted as defunct.

Notable former firms
 Esto-Muusika (music supply business in Estonia, existed 1921–1940)
 Radio Factory RET

See also 
 Economy of Estonia
 List of airlines of Estonia
 List of banks in Estonia

References 

 
Estonia